The Short S.47 Triple Tractor was one of a series of experimental twin-engined aircraft built by Short Brothers in 1912. It acquired its name because the two engines drove three tractor propellers.

Design and development
The Triple Tractor followed the Tandem Twin and Triple Twin in the series of twin-engined aircraft built by Short Brothers,   
the intention behind fitting two engines being to produce an aircraft capable of sustaining flight in the event of one engine failing. It was powered by a pair of  Gnome Double Omega engines mounted in tandem in the extended nose of the aircraft, the front engine driving a single propeller and the other driving a pair of tractor propellers mounted at mid-gap between the wings, using chains. In order to reduce the torque effect of the rotary engines they were arranged to revolve in opposite directions.

The airframe of the Triple Twin was similar to the contemporary S.36, S.41 and S.45 tractor biplanes built by Shorts, being an unequal-span two-seater two-bay biplane, with the square-section fuselage mounted in the gap between the upper and lower wings. The tail surfaces consisted of a rectangular rudder mounted on the sternpost of the fuselage, with a rectangular horizontal stabiliser and split elevator mounted in front of it on top of the fuselage.  The crew of two were seated side by side behind the trailing edge of the wings.

Service history
The aircraft was first flown by Frank McClean on 24 July 1912, and after a formal acceptance flight carried out by Lt. C. L'Estrange-Malone, the aircraft was bought by the Admiralty, being given the serial number T.4 at the Eastchurch Naval School. The aircraft performed well, the only problem being the amount of heat generated, earning it the nickname "The Field Kitchen".

Specifications

References

Notes

Bibliography
Barnes, C.H. Shorts Aircraft Since 1900 London: Putnam, 1967

1910s British experimental aircraft
Triple Tractor
Aircraft first flown in 1912
Biplanes
Twin piston-engined tractor aircraft